Melon Chan's Growth Diary (Japan: Melon-chan no Seichouki) is a Life simulation game in which the player raises and nurtures a little girl named Melon Chan. The game was only released in Japan and was one of the earliest titles released for the Neo Geo Pocket and, as such, features monochrome graphics.  It is compatible with the Neo Geo Pocket Color.

A sequel called Melon-Chan Growth Diary 2 was planned, but was cancelled.

References 

1998 video games
Neo Geo Pocket Color games
Japan-exclusive video games
Life simulation games
Video games about children
Video games developed in Japan
Video games featuring female protagonists